The Wild Affair is a 1965 British comedy film written and directed by John Krish and starring Nancy Kwan, Terry-Thomas, Jimmy Logan, Gladys Morgan, and Betty Marsden. It was adapted from the 1961 novel The Last Hours of Sandra Lee by William Sansom. Filmed in 1963, the film's release was delayed, finally opening in cinemas nationwide on 7 November 1965. The film went on to open in London cinemas from 28 November 1965.

Plot 
Secretary Marjorie Lee (Kwan) is engaged, but wants to have a fling before her wedding. She decides to attend the office holiday party, where her boss is the one who approaches her.

Cast

Production
In 1963, Nancy Kwan's long hair, famous from The World of Suzie Wong, was chopped into a sharp modernist bob by Vidal Sassoon for the film The Wild Affair, at the request of director John Krish. The image of her new hairstyle was published in the October editions of both American and British Vogue.  Vidal's new hairstyle was previously called the Mary Quant cut, as it had first featured in her fashion show, but became known as the Nancy Kwan cut.

Reception 
One reviewer deemed the film "more silly than sexy", while another thought that Nancy Kwan was miscast.

References

External links 
 
 
 Still of Bessie Love and Nancy Kwan

1965 films
1960s sex comedy films
British satirical films
British sex comedy films
British black-and-white films
1960s English-language films
Films based on British novels
Films directed by John Krish
1965 comedy films
1960s British films